The term "technological evolution" captures explanations of technological change that draw on mechanisms from evolutionary biology. Evolutionary biology has one of its roots in the book “On the origin of species” by Charles Darwin. In the style of this catchphrase, technological evolution might describe the origin of new technologies.

Combinatoric theory of technological change

The combinatoric theory of technological change states that every technology always consists of simpler technologies and a new technology is made of already existing technologies. One notion of this theory is that this interaction of technologies creates a network. All the technologies which interact to form a new technology can be thought of as complements, such as a screwdriver and a screw which by their interaction create the process of screwing a screw. This newly formed process of screwing a screw can be perceived as a technology itself and can therefore be represented by a new node in the network of technologies. The new technology itself can interact with other technologies to form a new technology again. If this process of combining existing technologies is repeated again and again, the network of technologies grows.

The here described mechanism of technological change has been termed “combinatorial evolution”. Others call it “technological recursion”.

Brian Arthur has elaborated how the theory is related to the mechanism of genetic recombination from evolutionary biology and in which aspects it differs.

History of technological evolution
Technological evolution is a theory of radical transformation of society through technological development. This theory originated with Czech philosopher Radovan Richta.

Mankind In Transition; A View of the Distant Past, the Present and the Far Future, Masefield Books, 1993. Technology (which Richta defines as "a material entity created by the application of mental and physical effort to nature in order to achieve some value") evolves in three stages: tools, machine, automation. This evolution, he says, follows two trends:

The pre-technological period, in which all other animal species remain today (aside from some avian and primate species) was a non-rational period of the early prehistoric man.

The emergence of technology, made possible by the development of the rational faculty, paved the way for the first stage: the tool. A tool provides a mechanical advantage in accomplishing a physical task, such as an arrow, plow, or hammer that augments physical labor to more efficiently achieve his objective. Later animal-powered tools such as  the plow and the horse, increased the productivity of food production about tenfold over the technology of the hunter-gatherers. Tools allow one to do things impossible to accomplish with one's body alone, such as seeing minute visual detail with a microscope, manipulating heavy objects with a pulley and cart, or carrying volumes of water in a bucket.

The second technological stage was the creation of the machine. A machine (a powered machine to be more precise) is a tool that substitutes part of or all of the element of human physical effort, requiring only the control of its functions. Machines became widespread with the industrial revolution, though windmills, a type of machine, are much older.

Examples of this include cars, trains, computers, and lights. Machines allow humans to tremendously exceed the limitations of their bodies. Putting a machine on the farm, a tractor, increased food productivity at least tenfold over the technology of the plow and the horse.

The third, and final stage of technological evolution is the automation. The automation is a machine that removes the element of human control with an automatic algorithm. Examples of machines that exhibit this characteristic are digital watches, automatic telephone switches, pacemakers, and computer programs.

It is crucial to understand that the three stages outline the introduction of the fundamental types of technology, and so all three continue to be widely used today. A spear, a plow, a pen, a knife, a glove, and an optical microscope are all examples of tools.

See also
Self-replicating machines in fiction
Sociocultural evolution
The Automated Society

References

External links 
The Evolution of Technology, George Basalla, University of Delaware

Technology in society
Evolution
Technological change